Nayanar may refer to:

Nayanars, Shaivite saints from Tamil Nadu, India
Nayanar (Nair subcaste), an honorific title used by certain clans of Nair caste from the north Malabar region of Kerala, India
E. K. Nayanar (1919–2004), Indian political leader, chief minister of Kerala